Idle Roomers is a 1944 short subject directed by Del Lord starring American slapstick comedy team The Three Stooges (Moe Howard, Larry Fine and Curly Howard). It is the 80th entry in the series released by Columbia Pictures starring the comedians, who released 190 shorts for the studio between 1934 and 1959.

Plot
The Stooges are bellhops at Hotel Snazzy Plaza, and pound each other in order to get some face time with an attractive woman (Christine McIntyre, in her debut appearance with the team). Unfortunately, she has an evil mean-tempered husband (Vernon Dent) who happens to excel in knife throwing. The husband is also secretly importing Lupe the Wolf Man (Duke York) who goes berserk when he hears music. Later on, when Curly is cleaning their room, he snaps on the radio, and the wolf man goes on the rampage. The stooges head for the elevator back to the lobby which contains the Wolf Man inside who is playing with the elevator switch which cause to crash through the roof and sends the trio and the Wolf Man high into the sky.

Production notes
Filmed on November 17–20, 1943, the title Idle Roomers is a pun on "idle rumors." The plot device of bellhops pursuing the affections of an attractive female hotel guest would be used in the 1953 Woody Woodpecker cartoon Belle Boys.

Idle Roomers marked the first appearance of regular Stooge co-star Christine McIntyre who would predominantly work with the team for the remainder of the series.

Much of the ending, involving the elevator, seems copied from the 1921 Buster Keaton short, The Goat (1921 film).

Curly Howard fades

Curly Howard's voice begins to deepen with this film. Since his 1940 divorce from Elaine Ackerman, Curly had lived a wild life, making merry on a regular basis, and drinking until the wee hours of the morning. Columbia cinematographer Henry Freulich stated in a 1984 interview that it was not unusual to see Curly stumbling into work looking like "he had himself a heluva time!" By 1944, the effects of Curly's lifestyle began to have an effect on his performances. Idle Roomers marks the first time his acting seems a little slower. The deeper voice confirms this assessment.

See also
List of American films of 1944

References

External links

 Idle Roomers - The Three Stooges Online Filmography
 
 

1944 films
1944 comedy films
American slapstick comedy films
American black-and-white films
Films set in hotels
The Three Stooges films
Columbia Pictures short films
Films directed by Del Lord
1940s English-language films
1940s American films